Prince Franz de Paula Joachim Joseph of Liechtenstein (25 February 1802 – 31 March 1887) was a son of Johann I Joseph, Prince of Liechtenstein, and his princess consort, Landgravine Josepha of Fürstenberg-Weitra. Prince Franz de Paula was a nephew of Prince Aloys I, brother of Prince Aloys II, and uncle of Princes Johann II and Franz I.

Marriage and issue
On 3 June 1841, in Vienna, he married Ewa Jozefina Julia Eudoxia Hrabia Potocka (Paris, 10 August 1818 – Vienna, 21 May 1895), sister of Count Alfred Józef Potocki (1817–1889), Sejm Marshal, Minister-President of Austria, and had four children: 
 Prince Alfred of Liechtenstein (1842–1907), married his first cousin Princess Henriette Maria of Liechtenstein (1843–1931)
 Princess Josefina Marie Juliane (Vienna, 22 April 1844 – Vienna, 10 October 1854), died young
 Prince Aloys Franz de Paula Maria (Prague, 19 November 1846 – Vienna, 25 March 1920), married firstly in London on 27 June 1872 Marie "Mary" Henriette Adelaide Fox (Paris, 21 December 1850 – Schloss Burgstall, Styria, 26 December 1878), adopted daughter of Henry Edward Fox, 4th Baron Holland, and wife Lady Mary Augusta Coventry, believed to be his own natural daughter, and had issue, four daughters, and married secondly in Vienna on 20 May 1890 Johanna Elisabeth Maria von Klinkosch (Vienna, 13 August 1849 – Baden bei Wien, 31 January 1925), daughter of Joseph Ritter von Klinkosch and wife Elise Swoboda, without issue: 
 Princess Sophie Maria Josepha (Berlin, 29 March 1873 – Graz, 2 March 1947), married in Graz on 31 July 1897 Franz Ürményi d'Ürmény (Ürmény, 14 January 1863 – Baden bei Wien, 20 February 1934), without issue
 Princess Julie Margarethe Maria (Schloss Burgstall, 20 July 1874 – Mayerling, 3 July 1950), unmarried and without issue
 Princess Henriette Maria Josefa (Schloss Burgstall, 6 July 1875 – Pertelstein, 21 April 1958), unmarried and without issue
 Princess Marie Johanna Franziska (Schloss Burgstall, 21 August 1877 – Vienna, 11 January 1939), married in Vienna on 7 June 1902 Franz, Graf von Meran, Freiherr von Brandhofen (Graz, 5 October 1868 - Bad Aussee, 10 November 1949), and had issue
 Prince Heinrich Karl August (Budapest, 6 November 1853 - Vienna, 15 February 1914), unmarried and without issue

Honours 
  Knight of the Military Order of Maria Theresa (Austrian Empire, 1850).
  Grand Cross of the Order of the Red Eagle, with Swords (Kingdom of Prussia, 3 March 1864).

Ancestry

References 

1802 births
1887 deaths
Princes of Liechtenstein
Knights Cross of the Military Order of Maria Theresa
Sons of monarchs